The twelfth series of the British television drama series Grange Hill began broadcasting on 3 January 1989, before ending on 10 March 1989 on BBC One. The series follows the lives of the staff and pupils of the eponymous school, an inner-city London comprehensive school. It consists of twenty episodes.

Cast and characters

Pupils

Teachers

Episodes

{| class="wikitable" style="width:100%;"
|-
! style="background-color: #333333; color:white"| No.
! style="background: #333333; color:white"| Episode
! style="background: #333333; color:white"| Writer
! style="background: #333333; color:white"| Director
! style="background: #333333; color:white"| Original airdate
|-
| align="center"| 1
| align="center"| Episode One
| align="center"| Barry Purchese
| align="center"| Laurence Williams
| align="center"| 3 January 1989
|-
| style="background:white" colspan="5" |Tegs brother returns home from prison. Mr. Bronson's car breaks down. Danny Kendall gets off to a bad start after he returns to school.
|- style="background:#333333; height:2px"
| colspan="5" |
|-

| align="center"| 2
| align="center"| Episode Two
| align="center"| Barry Purchese
| align="center"| Albert Barber
| align="center"| 6 January 1989
|-
| style="background:white" colspan="5" |Justine meets Tegs's brother who is still on the run. Vince saves Georgina with his "psychic powers". Gonch has yet another money making scheme.
|- style="background:#333333; height:2px"
| colspan="5" |
|-

| align="center"| 3
| align="center"| Episode Three
| align="center"| Barry Purchese
| align="center"| Albert Barber
| align="center"| 10 January 1989
|-
| style="background:white" colspan="5" |Trevor continues to be amazed by Vince's psychic powers. Teg's house is raided by the police.
|- style="background:#333333; height:2px"
| colspan="5" |
|-

| align="center"| 4
| align="center"| Episode Four
| align="center"| Margaret Simpson
| align="center"| Albert Barber
| align="center"| 13 January 1989
|-
| style="background:white" colspan="5" |Trevor Cleaver and Mauler McCaul gatecrash Ronnie's party.
|- style="background:#333333; height:2px"
| colspan="5" |
|-

| align="center"| 5
| align="center"| Episode Five
| align="center"| Kay Trainor
| align="center"| John Smith
| align="center"| 17 January 1989
|-
| style="background:white" colspan="5" |Miss Booth suggests the school introduces self-defence classes after Chrissy is mugged on her way to school. Danny starts work on the new swimming pool mosaic.
|- style="background:#333333; height:2px"
| colspan="5" |
|-

| align="center"| 6
| align="center"| Episode Six 
| align="center"| Kay Trainor
| align="center"| John Smith
| align="center"| 20 January 1989
|-
| style="background:white" colspan="5" |Gonch attempts to get Mandy Freemont to help with the homework service and attempts to impress her.
|- style="background:#333333; height:2px"
| colspan="5" |
|-

| align="center"| 7
| align="center"| Episode Seven
| align="center"| Chris Ellis
| align="center"| John Smith
| align="center"| 24 January 1989
|-
| style="background:white" colspan="5" |Danny's work experience is spoilt by Mr Bronson. Justine helps Tegs.
|- style="background:#333333; height:2px"
| colspan="5" |
|-

| align="center"| 8
| align="center"| Episode Eight
| align="center"| Chris Ellis
| align="center"| John Smith
| align="center"| 27 January 1989
|-
| style="background:white" colspan="5" | Mr Bronson and Ronnie are involved in a collision. Clarke and Matthew attempt to find the missing bike.
|- style="background:#333333; height:2px"
| colspan="5" |
|-

| align="center"| 9
| align="center"| Episode Nine
| align="center"| Margaret Simpson
| align="center"| Robert Gabriel
| align="center"| 31 January 1989
|-
| style="background:white" colspan="5" | Following Vince's failed prediction, Gonch is after him. Mauler wants a piece of Gonch's Sweepstake. Mauler and Ted chase Gonch and Ziggy through the estate and they end up making a shocking discovery.
|- style="background:#333333; height:2px"
| colspan="5" |
|-

| align="center"| 10
| align="center"| Episode Ten
| align="center"| Margaret Simpson
| align="center"| Robert Gabriel
| align="center"| 3 February 1989
|-
| style="background:white" colspan="5" |The pupils try to come to terms with Danny Kendall's death and they plant a tree when they hold a memorial service.
|- style="background:#333333; height:2px"
| colspan="5" |
|-

| align="center"| 11
| align="center"| Episode Eleven
| align="center"| David Angus
| align="center"| John Smith
| align="center"| 7 February 1989
|-
| style="background:white" colspan="5" |Ziggy and Robbie try to hide a drunken Trevor. Mr Bronson pulls out of the Isle of Wight trip.
|- style="background:#333333; height:2px"
| colspan="5" |
|-

| align="center"| 12
| align="center"| Episode Twelve
| align="center"| David Angus
| align="center"| John Smith
| align="center"| 10 February 1989 
|-
| style="background:white" colspan="5" |Mr. Bronson has a change of mind about the Isle of Wight trip. Justine finds out where Tegs has been hiding. Helen begins work experience as an engineer.
|- style="background:#333333; height:2px"
| colspan="5" |
|-

| align="center"| 13
| align="center"| Episode Thirteen
| align="center"| Margaret Simpson
| align="center"| Robert Gabriel
| align="center"| 14 February 1989
|-
| style="background:white" colspan="5" |Gonch ends up seeing Mandy in a completely different light on the Isle of Wight trip. Georgina's been getting notes from a secret admirer.
|- style="background:#333333; height:2px"
| colspan="5" |
|-

| align="center"| 14
| align="center"| Episode Fourteen
| align="center"| Margaret Simpson
| align="center"| Robert Gabriel
| align="center"| 17 February 1989
|-
| style="background:white" colspan="5" |Trevor's drinking comes to a dramatic head. Calley goes cold on Robbie. Mandy finds out the reason that Gonch originally asked her out.
|- style="background:#333333; height:2px"
| colspan="5" |
|-

| align="center"| 15
| align="center"| Episode Fifteen
| align="center"| Barry Purchese
| align="center"| John Smith
| align="center"| 21 February 1989
|-
| style="background:white" colspan="5" |Helen runs into Mauler whilst on her work experience. Mr. Bronson decides to give up teaching.

|- style="background:#333333; height:2px"
| colspan="5" |
|-

| align="center"| 16
| align="center"| Episode Sixteen
| align="center"| Barry Purchese
| align="center"| John Smith
| align="center"| 24 February 1989
|-
| style="background:white" colspan="5" |Mr. Griffiths, Mauler and Ziggy attempt to find the mystery intruder when it gets dark.

|- style="background:#333333; height:2px"
| colspan="5" |
|-

| align="center"| 17
| align="center"| Episode Seventeen
| align="center"| Sarah Daniels
| align="center"| Ronald Smedley
| align="center"| 28 February 1989
|-
| style="background:white" colspan="5" |Mauler is looking for a date. The owner of the ferocious dog is discovered by Clarke and Matthew. 
|- style="background:#333333; height:2px"
| colspan="5" |
|-

| align="center"| 18
| align="center"| Episode Eighteen
| align="center"| Sarah Daniels
| align="center"| Ronald Smedley
| align="center"| 3 March 1989
|-
| style="background:white" colspan="5" |Mauler is determined to get even with Gonch. Tegs returns to his old house.
|- style="background:#333333; height:2px"
| colspan="5" |
|-

| align="center"| 19
| align="center"| Episode Nineteen
| align="center"| David Angus
| align="center"| Ronald Smedley
| align="center"| 7 March 1989
|-
| style="background:white" colspan="5" |The school gets ready for an end of year prom. A present is bought for Mr. Bronson.
|- style="background:#333333; height:2px"
| colspan="5" |
|-

| align="center"| 20
| align="center"| Episode Twenty
| align="center"| David Angus
| align="center"| Ronald Smedley
| align="center"| 10 March 1989
|-
| style="background:white" colspan="5" |The school prom gets underway. Georgina’s and Ziggy’s friends work together to finally unite them.
|- style="background:#333333; height:2px"
| colspan="5" |
|-
|}

Release History
As of 2022, The twelfth series of Grange Hill has not been released on DVD

In December 2022 ITV announced that the twelfth series of Grange Hill will be available on its streaming platform ITVx as part of its BritBox content in January 2023

Notes

References

1989 British television seasons
Grange Hill